TONY! [The Tony Blair Rock Opera] is a musical comedy by Harry Hill and Steve Brown based on the life of former Prime Minister of the United Kingdom Tony Blair.

Production history 
The musical was originally announced to be presented at the Turbine Theatre in 2021 during MT Fest UK, however due to the COVID-19 pandemic it was presented virtually. The cast included Jenna Boyd, Scott Garnham, Gemma Knight Jones, Marie Lawrence, Simon Lipkin, Nicola Sloane and Paul Thornley.

The production made its world premiere at the Park Theatre, London beginning previews from 2 June with a press night on 8 June running until 9 July 2022, directed by Peter Rowe.

Following the success of the Park Theatre production, the musical will play a limited run at the Leicester Square Theatre from 15 April to 21 May 2023 before embarking on a UK tour.

Cast and characters

External links 

 Official website

References 

2022 musicals
Biographical musicals
British musicals
Rock operas